J. L. Gordon may refer to:

Lindsay Gordon, James Lindsay Gordon, Canadian air marshal
Judah Leib Gordon, known as Leon Gordon, Hebrew poet

See also
Gordon (surname)